How the States Got Their Shapes is a US television series that aired on the History Channel. It is hosted by Brian Unger and is based on Mark Stein's book, How the States Got Their Shapes.  The show deals with how the various states of the United States established their borders but also delves into other aspects of history, including failed states, proposed new states, and the local culture and character of various US states. It thus tackles the "shapes" of the states in a metaphorical sense as well as a literal sense.

Each episode has a particular theme, such as how the landscape, language, or natural resources contributed to the borders and character of various US states. The show format follows Unger as he travels to various locations and interviews local people, visits important historical and cultural sites, and provides commentary from behind the wheel of his car as he drives from location to location.  Interspersed with these segments are brief historical synopses by notable US historians.

The show started as a single two-hour special which first aired in April 2010 but returned as a regular series of one-hour shows starting in May 2011. Season 2 premiered in the fall of 2012, with a slightly more reality-oriented format and episodes shortened to half an hour, airing Saturdays on H2, with encore showings on Friday night on the History channel. Many of Season 2's episodes contained material already covered in Season 1.

Series overview

Episodes

Special (2010)

Season 1 (2011)

Season 2 (2012)

See also 
 United States territorial acquisitions
 Territorial evolution of the United States

References

Further reading 
 Stein, Mark, How the States Got Their Shapes, Smithsonian Books/Collins, 2008.

External links

2010 American television series debuts
2012 American television series endings

 
History (American TV channel) original programming
Television shows based on books
American television spin-offs
Television series about the history of the United States